Khadiya Dimni , khadiyahar (Zamindari) is a village in chambal region of Madhya Pradesh state in India. It is located in Morena. Khadiya is established by Rao saheb Gowardhan Singh of Biloni in 1742. 

Villages in Morena district